Allobacillus  is a Gram-positive and aerobic genus of bacteria from the family of Bacillaceae with one known species (Allobacillus halotolerans). Allobacillus halotolerans has been isolated from shrimp paste.

References

Bacillaceae
Bacteria genera
Monotypic bacteria genera